Fiddler's Green is a German band that plays Irish folk music. Formed in 1990, their first concert under the name of Fiddler's Green was at the Newcomer-Festival in Erlangen in November 1990. Their debut album entitled "Fiddler's Green" was released in 1992 and featured both live and studio tracks, some traditional and some original material. It was released on their own label, Deaf Shepherd Recordings. The band has been signed to a major label, but chose to go back to being independent. The band members themselves refer to their music as Irish Speedfolk, as opposed to Folk rock or Irish folk.

The band has kept up the mix of traditional Irish or Scottish songs and self-written tracks, though the self-written tracks have progressively become less and less folky. The band's influences are wide and varied, but obviously heavily influenced by Celtic rock bands like the Pogues, the Waterboys and Great Big Sea. Recent albums also see a clear influence from Gothic rock music. Having enjoyed growing success in and around Germany, the band reached 1000 played concerts in 2004 (the only band member to play them all is bass player Rainer Schulz), which was celebrated with a concert at Castle Hoheneck. This concert was filmed and released on two DVDs: Celebrate! and Jubilate! The concert saw participation from former band members and other guest musicians. Main lyric and music writer Peter Pathos left the band in summer 2006 and was replaced by Patrick 'Pat' Prziwara. A live DVD Folk's not dead was released to celebrate the band's 20th anniversary in 2010.

Members

Current lineup
 Ralf "Albi" Albers - vocals, guitar, Irish bouzouki, mandolin (1990–present)
 Rainer Schulz - bass (1990–present)
 Stefan Klug - accordion, bodhrán (1991–present)
 Tobias Heindl - violin, vocals (2000–present)
 Frank Jooss - drums, percussion (2001–present)
 Patrick "Pat" Prziwara - vocals, guitar (2006–present)

Former members
 Robert Oppel - violin (1990–1991)
 Eric Obst - drums (1990–1995)
 Tobias Rempe - violin (1991–1995)
 Tobias Schäfer - violin (1995–2000)
 Wolfram Kellner - drums (1995–2001)
 Peter Pathos - guitar, mandolin, banjo, flute (1990–2006)

Discography

Studio albums

Live albums

References

External links 

 Official website
 German Fansite
 Der grüne Geiger - Tobias Heindl

 Not to be confused with Fiddler's Green also the name of an Indian jam band playing acoustic folk music from all around the world. Band members are Arko Mukherjee, Diptanshu Roy, Ritoban Das & Shamik Chatterjee 
Image https://www.bbc.co.uk/programmes/p037b73x/p037bbsl http://fiddlersgreen.in

People from Erlangen
Folk punk groups
Celtic punk groups
German folk rock groups